WCPR may refer to:

 Abbreviation for Weekend City Press Review 
 WCPR (AM), a radio station (1450 AM) licensed to serve Coamo, Puerto Rico
 WCPR-FM, a radio station (97.9 FM) licensed to serve Wiggins, Mississippi, United States
 Weston, Clevedon and Portishead Railway